Edgemont, also known as The Jenks Homestead, is a historic home located in Middletown Township, Bucks County, Pennsylvania. It was originally built about 1820–1823, and is a -story, five bay, stuccoed stone dwelling in the Federal style.  About 1830, a rear kitchen ell was added and later modified in the 1870s.  The house was restored in the 1970s.

It was added to the National Register of Historic Places in 1977.

References

External links

Historic American Buildings Survey in Pennsylvania
Houses on the National Register of Historic Places in Pennsylvania
Federal architecture in Pennsylvania
Houses completed in 1820
Houses in Bucks County, Pennsylvania
National Register of Historic Places in Bucks County, Pennsylvania